The Port of Durban, commonly called Durban Harbour, is the largest and busiest shipping terminal in sub-Saharan Africa. It handles up to 31.4 million tons of cargo each year. It is the fourth largest container terminal in the Southern Hemisphere, handling approximately 4.5 million TEU in 2019.

Port statistics
 Durban is the busiest port in South Africa and generates more than 60% of revenue.
 It is the second largest container port in Africa (after Port Said in Egypt).
 It is the fourth largest container port in Southern Hemisphere. (First is Jakarta in Indonesia, second is Surabaya in Indonesia, third is Santos in Brazil).
 Rail tracks total .
 The port has 58 berths which are operated by more than 20 terminal operators.
 Over 4,500 commercial vessels call at the port each year.
The port has recently been widened. The harbor entrance depth is now  in the approach channel decreasing to 16 metres within the harbour. The navigation width is now .

The port saw a drop of  "5 per cent of the liner shipping services, 6.2 per cent of ship calls and 2.8 per cent of the deployed capacity" during the second quarter of 2020 due to the adverse impact of the global COVID-19 pandemic. However, the maximum capacity of container ships calling at the port increased by 14.5 percent during the same time period.

Port facilities

Berths
 Pier No. 1 Berth
 Pier No. 2 Berth
 Point and T-Jetty Berth
 Cross Berth
 Island View
 Bluff Berth
 Bayhead Berth
 Maydon Wharf Berth

Car terminal
Durban Car Terminal opened in 1998, with a capacity of 60,000 vehicles a year. In 2004 a 100-million-Rand expansion brought the number of bays to 6,500. This included a 380m bridge linking the terminal to the quayside, improving vessel turnaround time and improving security.

Cruise terminal
MSC Cruises bases the MSC Musica in Durban from November to April every year. From the 2019/2020 Southern Africa cruise season MSC Cruises will be basing the newer MSC Orchestra in Durban. Many other cruise ships pass through Durban every year, including some of the world's biggest, such as the RMS Queen Mary 2.

The tender to build the R215 million Durban Cruise Terminal was awarded to KwaZulu Cruise Terminal (Pty) Ltd which is 70% owned by MSC Cruises SA and 30% by Africa Armada Consortium. The terminal will be able to accommodate two cruise ships at any given time.

Naval facilities
Naval Base Durban, situated on Salisbury Island, is part of the Port of Durban. Established during the Second World War, it was downgraded to a naval station in 2002. In 2012 a decision was made to renovate and expand the facilities back up to a full naval base to accommodate the South African Navy's offshore patrol flotilla. In December 2015 it was redesignated a naval base. It is the home port of three Warrior-class interim offshore patrol vessels (formerly missile-armed fast attack craft) which will be replaced by a new patrol flotilla within four to five years.

Expansion plans 
In April 2021, South African officials revealed a $7 billion modernization and expansion plan of the port facilities in order to increase efficiency and improve its standing as one of Africa's best and biggest ports. The program is expected expand port capacity from 2.9 million TEU to more than 11 million TEU by 2031.

The plan has been criticized by labour unions over not being consulted on the construction contracts, and warned that the government's intention to partner with the private sector to complete the expansion could lead to job losses for a highly indebted state-owned company.

See also
 List of ports of entry in South Africa
 2021 Transnet Cyberattack

References

External links

Durban
Transport in Durban
Ports and harbours in Africa
Infrastructure in South Africa